Chittaranjan Cintamanrav Kolhatkar (15 January 1923 – 25 October 2009) was an Indian film and theatre actor.

Born in 1923 in the Amravati district of Maharashtra, Kolhatkar began his film career in 1944, appearing in the film Garibanche Rajya. His theatre debut was in Bhavbandhan written by Ram Ganesh Gadkari.

Politically, Kolhatkar was a firm supporter of the Hindu nationalist political ideology Hindutva. He appeared in more than 100 films.

Kolhatkar was admitted to the Dinanath Mangeshkar Hospital in Pune on 13 October 2009 after suffering a fall during his evening walk. On 25 October, he suffered a heart attack and died, aged 86.

Works
 As actor
 Mohityanchi Manjula (Film, 1963) 
 Ashroonchi Zhali Phule (Play)

References

External links

1923 births
2009 deaths
Indian male film actors
Indian male stage actors
Marathi people
Male actors in Marathi theatre